Breit–Wigner distribution may refer to:

 Cauchy distribution, also known as the Lorentz distribution or the (non-relativistic) Breit–Wigner distribution
 Relativistic Breit–Wigner distribution, a continuous probability distribution

See also 
 Wigner distribution (disambiguation)